Saint Procopius Church of Tirana is an Orthodox church on the outskirts of Tirana, Albania. It was one of only two Orthodox churches that existed in the city before World War II, the other one being the 19th-century Evangelismos Church, which was demolished in 1967.

History

Old building
In 1787 the Bargjini family, feudals of Tirana, gave the permit to the Orthodox community of Tirana to construct the church, as a compensation for the protection that the community had offered in the local defense of the city against the attacks of Kurt Pasha of Berat. The church was built between 1790 and 1797 although in the church codex the donators of the construction can be traced only in a 1818 entry, as copies of the prior codex have been lost. A considerable part of the community were Vlachs and the codex, which included all the important activities of the church was written in Greek. The construction was half underground, whereas no bells were allowed, as was the law for newly constructed churches in Muslim countries. The church had dimensions of 22m long and 13m wide. The construction in 1874 of the Evangelismos Church, in the central plaza of Tirana (later demolished in 1967), entailed a smaller attendance to the Saint Procopius Church.

Current building
In 1940 a new urbanistic plan for Tirana was approved. The Orthodox community of Tirana accepted moving the old church into a new building, which would be located at the Park of Saint Procopius, around 25m over the level of the old one, and around 400m away from it. Kristofor Kisi, then primate of the Albanian Orthodox Church entrusted  with the project of the new building Skënder Luarasi, a young architect who had graduated from the University of Vienna, and was son of patriot Kristo Luarasi. Ing Lucca & Co, Milano-Napoli was the company that built it, and the new church was ready in 1942, and inaugurated in 1945, right after World War II. In December 2017, Tirana Mayor Erion Veliaj announced a project to restore the church to its pre-1967 state.

References

Sources
 

Churches completed in 1797
18th-century churches in Albania
Churches completed in 1942
20th-century churches in Albania
Churches in Tirana
Albanian Orthodox churches
1797 establishments in the Ottoman Empire